Domingo Careaga Achalandabaso (3 August 1897 - 29 August 1947) was a Spanish footballer who played as a defender for Arenas de Getxo. Careaga spent all 14 seasons of his playing career with Arenas de Getxo, thus being a historical member of the club and part of the so-called one-club men group. He also played in four matches for the Spain national football team between 1921 and 1923.

Club career
Born in Getxo, he began his career at his hometown club Arenas de Getxo in 1916, and he remained loyal to the club for the next 14 years. He played a pivotal role in helping the Copa del Rey final on two occasions, in 1917 and 1919, which ended in a loss to Real Madrid and in a 5–2 win over FC Barcelona.

International career
He made his debut for the Spanish national team on 9 October 1921 against the 1920 Summer Olympics gold medalists Belgium, keeping a clean-sheet in a 2-0 win. In his next cap on 16 December 1923 he scored again, netting a hat-trick in the Iberian derby to help his side to a 3-0 win. In total, he earned 4 caps in which he only conceded one goal.

Like many other Arenas de Getxo players of that time, he played a few games for the Biscay national team, participating in both the 1922–23 and the 1923–24 Prince of Asturias Cups, an official inter-regional competition organized by the RFEF. In the quarter-finals of the 1922–23 edition against Asturias, Careaga slotted a penalty in the 132nd minute of extra-time to level the scores at 3–3, but they were ultimately eliminated 3–4 courtesy of a brace from Rogelio Barril.

Honours

Club
Arenas Club
North Championships
Champions (5): 1916–17, 1918–19, 1921–22, 1924–25 and 1926–27

Copa del Rey
Champions (1): 1919
Runner-up (1): 1917

References

1897 births
Spain international footballers
Spanish footballers
Association football defenders
1947 deaths
Arenas Club de Getxo footballers
Footballers from Getxo
La Liga players